Bym is a rural locality (a selo) in Troyelzhanskoye Rural Settlement, Kungursky District, Perm Krai, Russia. The population was 465 as of 2010. There are 14 streets.

Geography 
Bym is located 48 km west of Kungur (the district's administrative centre) by road. Rybinka is the nearest rural locality.

References 

Rural localities in Perm Krai